Helen Bailey was an eight-year-old schoolgirl who was killed near her home in Great Barr, Birmingham, England, on 10 August 1975.

Bailey, a pupil at Calshot Junior School, lived in nearby Booths Farm Road. The day after she was reported missing her body was found by her father, after ten hours of a police-coordinated search, in woodland on the site of the former, and eponymous, farm. Her throat had been cut. Because she was wearing blue at the time of her death, media dubbed her "Little Girl Blue".

Investigation and aftermath
A March 1976 inquest heard from an official pathologist that she may have died as the result of an "accident or practical joke gone wrong" and the jury subsequently returned an open verdict.

In 2014, following a cold case review, new evidence came to light, that she had been strangled before her throat was cut. A new pathologist said her death was a "clear case of homicide". As a result, West Midlands Police asked Louise Hunt, Birmingham and Solihull's senior coroner, to seek permission to overturn the original inquest verdict. 

In 2017, a renewed appeal for witnesses, and for the killer to come forward, was made on the BBC television programme Crimewatch Roadshow.

In December 2018 Lord Justice Hickinbottom, sitting with Mrs Justice Whipple, ordered that a new inquest be held. Hickinbottom noted that a confession had been made by a suspect in 1979, that matched the 2014 evidence, but at the time the Crown Prosecution Service (CPS) had decided not to prosecute him. At a pre-inquest review in May 2019, the Detective Chief Superintendent leading the cold-case investigation said that a serving prisoner, the only suspect arrested (but not charged) in the 1970s, and subsequently convicted of an unrelated offence, was the only suspect in the case.

At an inquest on 5 July 2019, the original verdict was overturned and replaced with one of unlawful killing. The coroner, Louise Hunt, expressed an intention to ask the CPS to reconsider their decision not to prosecute the suspect.

See also
Death of Jessie Earl
List of unsolved murders in the United Kingdom

Notes

References 

1970s missing person cases
1975 deaths
Female murder victims
Formerly missing people
Great Barr
History of Birmingham, West Midlands
Missing person cases in England
People from Birmingham, West Midlands
Unsolved crimes in England
Unsolved murders in England